Neoeulia dorsistriatana is a species of moth of the family Tortricidae. It is found in Arizona in the United States.

References

Moths described in 1884
Euliini